Oak Hill Estate, also known as Mt. St. Macrina and Fox Hill, is a historic estate located at North Union Township, Fayette County, Pennsylvania.  On the property are seven contributing buildings, four contributing sites, and one contributing structure.  The estate was developed in 1903, by coal baron J.V. Thompson, an associate of Henry Clay Frick. The estate was conceptualized by architect Daniel Burnham. The mansion is a 3-story, 42-room, 18,313 square foot, brick building in the Classical Revival style.  Other contributing buildings include the a smaller residence built for Thompson's son, a pool house, carriage house / stable, pumphouse, schoolhouse / servant's quarters, and garage.  The contributing sites and structure are the Springer cemetery (c. 1840), west gate and drive, stone wall, and the remains of a small garage, race track, and conservatory / pool.   The private estate was sold after Thompson's death in 1933, to the Sisters of the Order of St. Basil the Great.

It was added to the National Register of Historic Places in 1999.

References

External links

Sisters of the Order of St. Basil the Great website: Mount Saint Macrina

Houses on the National Register of Historic Places in Pennsylvania
Neoclassical architecture in Pennsylvania
Houses completed in 1903
Houses in Fayette County, Pennsylvania
National Register of Historic Places in Fayette County, Pennsylvania